Gijsbert Marius "Gijs" de Vries (born 22 February 1956) is a retired Dutch-American politician and diplomat who served as State Secretary for the Interior and Kingdom Relations from 1998 to 2002 and European Union Counter-terrorism Coordinator from 2004 until 2007. He was a member of the People's Party for Freedom and Democracy (VVD) until 2010, when he joined the Democrats 66 (D66) party.

Career
From 1984 to 1998, Gijs de Vries was a Member of the European Parliament (MEP) for three consecutive terms. From 1994 to 1998, he was chairman of the group of the European Liberal Democrat and Reform Party. He resigned from the European Parliament to become State Secretary for the Interior and Kingdom Relations under the Second Kok cabinet. He was later appointed the European Union's anti-terrorism coordinator from March 2004 to March 2007. As of September 2008, he was chairman of the European Security Research and Innovation Forum (ESRIF).

As the EU anti-terrorism coordinator, he worked for Javier Solana in the Police and Judicial Co-operation in Criminal Matters (PJCCM) pillar. Solana outlined his duties as being to streamline, organise and co-ordinate the EU and its members fight against terrorism.

He stood down from the post in March 2007, citing personal reasons, although it is commonly understood that the position's mandate did not have the necessary operational powers, as well as an overall reluctance within member states to supply information regarding anti-terror activities, even though the member states fully supported the establishment of the anti-terrorism coordinator after the 2004 Madrid train bombings. In September 2007, MEPs called for the post to be filled, having been vacant for six months, as well as for it to be given real powers to carry out the post's tasks. On 20 September 2007, the Belgian Gilles de Kerchove was appointed to succeed De Vries in the post.

Prior to 2010 De Vries had been a member of the People's Party for Freedom and Democracy (VVD). However, due to dissatisfaction at the VVD's decision to form the First Rutte cabinet, a minority government with the support of the Party for Freedom (PVV) led by nationalist Geert Wilders he left the party and joined the social-liberal Democrats 66 (D66) party then in opposition.

Decorations

References

External links

Official
  Drs. G.M. (Gijs) de Vries Parlement & Politiek

 
 

1956 births
Living people
Counterterrorism and the European Union
Democrats 66 politicians
Dutch expatriates in Belgium
Dutch expatriates in England
Dutch officials of the European Union
Dutch political writers
European Court of Auditors
Experts on terrorism
Fellows of St Antony's College, Oxford
Governmental studies academics
Leiden University alumni
Academic staff of Leiden University
Members of the Court of Audit (Netherlands)
Members of the House of Representatives (Netherlands)
MEPs for the Netherlands 1984–1989
MEPs for the Netherlands 1989–1994
MEPs for the Netherlands 1994–1999
Officers of the Order of Orange-Nassau
People from Leiden
People from New York City
People's Party for Freedom and Democracy MEPs
People's Party for Freedom and Democracy politicians
State Secretaries for the Interior of the Netherlands
Terrorism studies
Terrorism theorists
20th-century Dutch civil servants
20th-century Dutch diplomats
20th-century Dutch economists
20th-century Dutch male writers
20th-century Dutch politicians
21st-century Dutch civil servants
21st-century Dutch diplomats
21st-century Dutch economists
21st-century Dutch educators
21st-century Dutch male writers
21st-century Dutch politicians